Matilda Leathes, née Butt (1830-1922) was a British novelist. She also published as Mrs. Stanley Leathes.

Life

Matilda Butt was born in 1830 in Swansea. She was the daughter of John Martin Butt, rector of East Garston in Berkshire, and a niece of the novelist Mary Martha Sherwood. On 6 July 1858 she married the Hebrew scholar Stanley Leathes. Their children included Stanley Mordaunt Leathes and John Beresford Leathes.

She died on 17 November 1922 at Box, Wiltshire.

Works
 Ruth Levison. London: Joseph Masters, 1860.
 (as the author of 'Ruth Levison') Charity at home. A tale. London: Joseph Masters, 1863.
 Soimême: a story of a wilful life. London: Rivingtons, 1869.
 Penelope: or, Morning clouds dispersed. London: Hodder and Stoughton, 1873.
 (as the author of 'Letty Deane') Our village worthies: or, Stories of village life. London: S.P.C.K., 1876.
 The girls of Bredon, and Manor House stories. London: S.P.C.K., 1877.
 On the doorsteps, or, Crispin's story. London: J. F. Shaw, 1880.
 All among the daisies. London: J. F. Shaw, 1881.
 Jack and Jill of our own day. London: J. F. Shaw & Co., 1882. Illustrated by Madeleine Erwin.
 Ingle-nook stories. London: J. F. Shaw & Co., 1883. Illustrated by Madeleine Erwin.
 The caged linnet: or, Love's labour not lost. London: J. F. Shaw, 1883.
 Other lives than ours : fables in prose. London: J. F. Shaw, 1884.
 Afloat: a story. London: J. F. Shaw, 1886
 Over the hills and far away. London: J. F. Shaw, 1887.
 To-morrow : a story. London: J. F. Shaw, 1887.
 Dody and Joss, or, All's well that ends well. London, 1889.
 Holidays in Summer and Winter. London: Shaw & Co., 1890.
 Miss Limpett's lodgers. London : Religious Tract Society, 1895. Penny tales for the people, no. 87.
 Zetty Craig, or, no cross no crown . Edinburgh: Nelson and Sons, 1898.

References

1830 births
1922 deaths
Welsh novelists